The 2006 MAC Championship Game was played on November 30, 2006 at Ford Field in Detroit, Michigan.  The game featured the winner of each division of the Mid-American Conference. The game featured the Ohio Bobcats, of the East Division, and the Central Michigan Chippewas, of the West Division. The Chippewas beat the Bobcats 31–10.

References

Championship Game
MAC Championship Game
Central Michigan Chippewas football games
Ohio Bobcats football games
American football competitions in Detroit
MAC Championship Game
MAC Championship
MAC Championship Game